Básico is the first live album from Spanish singer Alejandro Sanz. Básico was released in promotion of Si Tú Me Miras. The album features a concert recorded in 1993, in which he gave an acoustic treatment to the hits of Viviendo Deprisa and Si Tú Me Miras. The album was originally a limited edition, but after the success of the album Más, it was re-edited on 26 May 1998.

Track listing 
 Mi Primera Canción – 5:48
 Pisando Fuerte – 4:35
 Que No Te Daría Yo – 4:03
 Si Tú Me Miras – 4:02
 Cómo Te Echo de Menos – 3:59
 Los Dos Cogidos de la Mano – 4:40
 Tu Letra Podré Acariciar – 3:32
 A Golpes Contra el Calendario – 5:16
 Se Le Apagó la Luz – 4:36
 Viviendo Deprisa – 3:36

Personnel 
 Domingo J. Casas – Photography
 Nando González – Background vocals, acoustic guitar
 Guere – Background vocals, acoustic bass
 Nacho Mañó – Producer, director
 Nacho Mañó – Acoustic guitar ("Tu Letra Podré Acariciar" and "A Golpes Contra el Calendario")
 Gino Pavone – Percussion
 Fran Rubio – Rhodes piano, piano
 Alejandro Sanz – Vocals, Spanish guitar, acoustic guitar
 Fernando Toussaint – Drums
 R. Vigil – Design
 Juan Vinader – Engineer, mixing

Sales and certifications

References

Alejandro Sanz live albums
1994 live albums